Theoklitos Polyeidis was a Greek scholar, teacher, translator, priest and monk during the period of the Modern Greek Enlightenment.

His most notable work was the Oracles of Agathagelos (Οι χρησμοί του Αγαθάγγελου) which was written , and had a huge appeal in the court of Catherine II in Petersburg and greatly enhanced philhellenism in the European cities he personally visited. The Oracles of Agathagelos was also later republished by Rigas Feraios, promoting the revolutionary spirit of the subjugated Greeks, because they prophesied the future liberation of the Greeks.

Biography 
He was born in 1698 in Adrianople, then part of the Ottoman Empire (now Edirne, Turkey) to a well-off merchant father. He graduated from the Academy of Ioannis Zygomalas. He then became a monk in Iviron Monastery of Mount Athos. He became a deacon in 1713 and a presbyter in 1719. In 1725 he was ordained archimandrite, and in particular he was named by the Ecumenical Patriarchate as Grand Archimandrite, Grand Ecclesiarch of Mount Athos, and Bishop of Polyani and Kilkis.

In 1731 he travelled to Germany and then to Russia as an envoy of the Patriarchate. During his trips to Europe he visited Menorca, where he also served as a teacher and a pastor. Theoklitos came into contact with social, political, diplomatic and religious practices throughout Europe. He was concerned about the political implications of the Reformation and studied the problems that concerned the Greek diaspora.

He then attempted to mobilize the enslaved Greeks by verifying old prophecies of the Byzantine Empire. He wrote Agathangelos (el), a well known prophetic work which was published, with minor variations, widely in Greece, either as a brochure (by Rigas Feraios) or as a book in Athens and Ermoupoli (1837–38). He dates the oracles back to the 13th century (1279), and claims that the original author of the work is the monk Ieronymus Agathagelus from Messina in Sicily. The latter prophesies geopolitical events in the coming centuries (which Polyeidis, the true author, knew about). It fascinated the popular masses, who were becoming more optimistic about their liberation. Thus, the supposed Latin translator of the prophetic work, Theoklitos, remains under the shadow of the narrator Agathagelus.

He stayed in Dresden (1741) and shortly afterwards settled, after an invitation of the inhabitants, in neighboring Leipzig, where he founded the first Orthodox chapel (then of the Holy Trinity, now of St. George). He died in 1759 in Leipzig.

References

Sources 
  
 Encyclopedia «Δομή», vol. ΙΓ΄ λήμμα:Πολυειδής, Θεόκλητος

1698 births
1759 deaths
People from Edirne
Greek educators
Greek bishops
Greek scholars
Athonite Fathers
Scholars in Eastern Orthodoxy
18th-century Greek people
People associated with Iviron Monastery